Rayya is a city and municipality in Amritsar district in the Indian state of Punjab. Rayya is about 35 km from Amritsar and 45 km from Jalandhar. It is 5 km from the Beas River.

Parties like Indian National Congress Party have also been in power but not as frequently as the Shiromani Akali Dal Party.

References

External links
http://www.pon.nic.in/open/depts/.../census/HOMEPAGE.HTM
http://censusindia.gov.in/

Cities and towns in Amritsar district